Mohan Prasad Pandey is a Nepalese politician, belonging to the Nepali Congress. In the 2008 Constituent Assembly election he was elected from the Syangja-3 constituency, winning with 18419 votes. Pandey was elected for the first time with two other congress candidates in the district.

References

Living people
Nepali Congress politicians from Gandaki Province
Nepal MPs 2017–2022
Members of the 1st Nepalese Constituent Assembly
1962 births